Amitriptyline/perphenazine (Duo-Vil, Etrafon, Triavil, Triptafen) is a formulation that contains the tricyclic antidepressant amitriptyline and the medium-potency typical (first-generation) antipsychotic, perphenazine. In the United States amitriptyline/perphenazine is marketed by Mylan Pharmaceuticals Inc. and Remedy Repack Inc.

Medical uses
In the United States amitriptyline/perphenazine is indicated for the treatment of patients with:
 Moderate-severe anxiety and/or agitation and depression
 Depression and anxiety in association with chronic physical disease
 Schizophrenia with prominent depressive symptoms

Adverse effects
Common (>1% incidence) adverse effects include
 Sedation
 Hypertension — high blood pressure.
 Neurological impairments (such as extrapyramidal side effects which include dystonia, akathisia, parkinsonism, muscle rigidity, etc.)
 Anticholinergic side effects such as:
- Blurred vision
- Constipation
- Dry mouth
- Nasal congestion
 Increased appetite
 Weight gain
 Nausea
 Dizziness
 Headache
 Vomiting

Unknown frequency adverse effects include
 Diarrhoea
 Alopecia — hair loss
 Photophobia
 Pigmentation
 Eczema up to exfoliative dermatitis
 Urticaria
 Erythema
 Itching
 Photosensitivity (increased sensitivity of affected skin to sunlight)
 Hypersalivation — excessive salivation.
 Hyperprolactinaemia — elevated blood prolactin levels. This may present with the following symptoms:
- Galactorrhea — the release of milk that is not associated with pregnancy or breastfeeding
- Gynaecomastia — the development of breast tissue in males
- Disturbances in menstrual cycle
- Sexual dysfunction
 Pigmentation of the cornea and lens
 Hyperglycaemia — elevated blood glucose (sugar) levels.
 Hypoglycaemia — low blood glucose (sugar) levels.
 Disturbed concentration
 Excitement
 Anxiety
 Insomnia
 Restlessness
 Nightmares
 Weakness
 Fatigue
 Diaphoresis — excessive/abnormal sweating.

Uncommon/Rare adverse effects include
 Tardive dyskinesia, an often irreversible adverse effect that usually results from chronic use antipsychotic medications, especially the high-potency first-generation antipsychotics. It is characterised by slow (hence tardive), involuntary, repetitive, purposeless muscle movements. 
 Neuroleptic malignant syndrome, a potentially fatal complication of antipsychotic drug use. It is characterised by the following symptoms:
- Muscle rigidity
- Tremors
- Mental status change (e.g. hallucinations, agitation, stupor, confusion, etc.)
- Hyperthermia — elevated body temperature
- Autonomic instability (e.g. tachycardia, high blood pressure, diaphoresis, diarrhoea, etc.)
 Urinary retention — the inability to pass urine despite having urine to pass.
 Blood dyscrasias e.g. agranulocytosis (a potentially fatal drop in white blood cell count), leukopaenia (a drop in white blood cell counts but not to as extreme an extent as agranulocytosis), neutropaenia (a drop in neutrophil [the cells of the immune system that specifically destroy bacteria] count), thrombocytopaenia (a dangerous drop in platelet [a cell found in the blood that plays a crucial role in the blood clotting process] counts), purpura (the appearance of red or purple discolourations of the skin that do not blanch when pressure is applied), eosinophilia (raised eosinophil [the cells of the immune system that specifically fights off parasites] count)
 Hepatitis — inflammation of the liver
 Jaundice
 Pigmentary retinopathy
 Anaphylactoid reactions
 Oedema — the abnormal buildup of fluids in the tissues
 Asthma
 Coma
 Seizures
 Confusional states
 Disorientation
 Incoordination
 Ataxia
 Tremors
 Peripheral neuropathy — nerve damage
 Numbness, tingling and paresthesias of the extremities
 Dysarthria
 Syndrome of inappropriate antidiuretic hormone secretion (SIADH)
 Tinnitus — falsely hearing ringing in the ears. 
 Alteration in EEG patterns
 Paralytic ileus — cessation of the peristaltic waves that propel partially digested food through the digestive tract.
 Hyperpyrexia (elevated body temperature)
 Disturbance of accommodation
 Increased intraocular pressure
 Mydriasis

Pharmacology

Binding affinities (Ki[nM]; for human cloned receptors when available)

See also
 Flupentixol/melitracen
 Olanzapine/fluoxetine
 Tranylcypromine/trifluoperazine

References

Muscarinic antagonists
Tricyclic antidepressants
Typical antipsychotics
Combination drugs